The 2006 Individual Speedway Junior World Championship was the 30th edition of the World motorcycle speedway Under-21 Championships.

The final was won by Karol Ząbik of Poland.

World final
September 2, 2006
 Terenzano, Olympia Speedway Stadium

Heat after heat
 Ząbik, Carpanese, King, Miedziński
 Miesiąc, Aldén, Kling, Moller
 Hefenbrock, Lindbäck, Holder, Petterson
 Lindgren, Pavlic, Hlib, Simota
 Lindgren, King, Lindbäck, Kling
 Hlib, Miedziński, Petterson, Miesiąc
 Holder, Aldén, Carpanese, Pavlic
 Ząbik, Moller, Hefenbrock, Simota
 Miesiąc, Simota, Holder, King
 Hefenbrock, Kling, Miedziński, Pavlic
 Lindbäck, Moller, Hlib, Carpanese
 Lindgren, Ząbik, Petterson, Aldén
 Hefenbrock, Hlib, King, Aldén
 Miedziński, Lindgren, Moller, Holder (F/X)
 Simota, Carpanese, Kling, Petterson
 Lindbäck, Ząbik, Miesiąc, Pavlic
 Pavlic, Batchelor (for Pettersona), Moller, King (F/X)
 Lindbäck, Miedziński, Simota, Aldén (E)
 Lindgren, Hefenbrock, Miesiąc, Carpanese (F)
 Ząbik, Kling, Hlib, Holder
Big Final:
 Ząbik, Lindbäck, Hefenbrock, Lindgren (F/X)

References

2006
World I J
2006 in Italian motorsport
Speedway competitions in Italy